Obsolete military awards of the United States are United States military awards which have been officially removed from U.S. military award precedence charts and are listed as "Obsolete Military Decorations" in military award publications and instructions.

Typically, the U.S. military will declare a decoration obsolete twenty to thirty years after its last issuance to an active duty member of the military or, in the case of medals designed for members of the reserve forces, a drilling reservist attending annual training.  Medals for valor (such as the Medal of Honor and Silver Star) are rarely declared obsolete regardless of the amount of time which has passed since the last issuance.  This is since such medals could be reinstated, on very short notice, in the event of an armed conflict in which the United States armed forces would be called to service.

Although United States service medals of the World Wars have also been declared obsolete by the U.S. military, many may still be found in various charts, publications, and instructions.  This is since a large number of veterans still display such medals as retirement awards or through functions and ceremonies with various veteran groups such as the Veterans of Foreign Wars and the American Legion.

The following decorations have been declared obsolete with most such decorations indicating service in military operations prior to 1935.

Revolutionary War

Inter-service

Army service

Navy and Marine Corps service

Coast Guard service

Air Force service

See also
 Awards and decorations of the United States military
 Obsolete badges of the United States military

Awards, Obsolete
Military United States